Black Mesa National Forest was established as the Black Mesa Forest Reserve by the General Land Office in Arizona on February 22, 1897 with .  After the transfer of federal forests to the U.S. Forest Service in 1905, it became a National Forest on March 4, 1907. On July 1, 1908 the forest was divided among Sitgreaves, Tonto, Apache and Coconino National Forests and the name was discontinued.

References

External links
 Forest History Society
 Forest History Society:Listing of the National Forests of the United States Text from Davis, Richard C., ed. Encyclopedia of American Forest and Conservation History. New York: Macmillan Publishing Company for the Forest History Society, 1983. Vol. II, pp. 743–788.

Former National Forests of Arizona
Protected areas established in 1897
1897 establishments in Arizona Territory
1908 disestablishments in Arizona Territory
Protected areas disestablished in 1908